The 1998 Florida State Seminoles baseball team represented Florida State University in the 1998 NCAA Division I baseball season. The Seminoles played their home games at Dick Howser Stadium and played as part of the Atlantic Coast Conference. The team was coached by Mike Martin in his nineteenth season as head coach at Florida State.

The Seminoles reached the College World Series, their fifteenth appearance in Omaha, where they finished tied for seventh place after recording losses to eventual runner-up Arizona State and fourth-place .

Personnel

Roster

Coaches

Schedule and results

References

Florida State Seminoles baseball seasons
Florida State Seminoles
College World Series seasons
Florida State Seminoles baseball
Florida State
Atlantic Coast Conference baseball champion seasons